FK Litvínov is a football club located in Litvínov, Czech Republic. The club currently plays in the Czech Fourth Division. The club has taken part numerous times in the Czech Cup, reaching the third round in the 2005–06 edition.

References

External links
  

Football clubs in the Czech Republic
Most District